Aortic lymph nodes may refer to:

 Lateral aortic lymph nodes
 Paraaortic lymph node
 Retroaortic lymph nodes